Timothy or Tim Taylor may refer to:

Sportspeople
 Timothy Taylor (cricketer) (born 1961), English cricketer
 Tim Taylor (ice hockey, born 1969), Canadian ice hockey player
 Tim Taylor (ice hockey coach) (1942–2013), American ice hockey coach
 Tim Taylor (rugby union, born 1982), English rugby union player
 Tim Taylor (rugby union, born 1888) (1888–1966), English international rugby union player

Art
 Timothy Taylor (art dealer), British art dealer
 Timothy Taylor (gallery), an art gallery in Mayfair, London, owned and founded by the art dealer Timothy Taylor

Others
 Timothy Taylor (archaeologist) (born 1960), British archaeologist
 Timothy Taylor (economist) (born 1960), American economist and academic professor
 Timothy Taylor (writer) (born 1963), Canadian novelist
 Timothy Taylor Brewery, a British brewery
 Tim Taylor (character), the main character of Home Improvement TV series
 Tim Taylor (newscaster) (born 1940), former newscaster on the news show for the Cleveland, Ohio channel WJW
 Tim Taylor (producer), producer for Channel 4's archaeology series Time Team
 Tim Taylor (politician), member of the Missouri House of Representatives
 Tim Taylor (1969–1997), guitarist/keyboardist/vocalist for Brainiac (band)
TJ Taylor (musician) (Timothy Lewis Taylor Jr.), American drummer

See also
 Tim Brooke-Taylor (born 1940), British comic actor

Taylor, Timothy